Urdiain is a town and municipality located in the province of Navarre, in the autonomous community of Navarre, in the North of Spain.

References

External links
 URDIAIN in the Bernardo Estornés Lasa - Auñamendi Encyclopedia (Euskomedia Fundazioa) 

Municipalities in Navarre